Etamin may refer to:
 Gamma Draconis, a star in the constellation Draco.
 USS Etamin (AK-93) a United States navy ship.